Élie Gesbert (born 1 July 1995) is a French racing cyclist, who currently rides for UCI ProTeam . Gesbert competed in the Tour de France in 2017, 2018 and 2019.

Career

Fortuneo–Vital Concept (2016–present) 
Born in Saint-Brieuc, Gesbert rode the Tour de France for the first time in 2017, and started as the first rider in the opening stage individual time trial. He took his first professional win at the Tour du Limousin, as he won stage 1, where he also finished 2nd overall.

Gesbert rode his first Monument classic in 2018, at Liège–Bastogne–Liège, and finished 91st. He also participated in the Tour de France during which he was the victim of a punch from fellow competitor Gianni Moscon, which Moscon was later disqualified from the race for.

Major results

2013
 1st  Road race, National Junior Road Championships
2015
 1st Stage 6 Tour de l'Avenir
 2nd Kreiz Breizh Elites
2016
 1st Stage 3 Ronde de l'Isard
2017
 2nd Overall Tour du Limousin
1st  Young rider classification
1st Stage 1
 4th Overall Tour de Bretagne
1st Stage 6
 6th Overall Tour du Gévaudan Languedoc-Roussillon
  Combativity award Stage 10 Tour de France
2019
 4th Overall Tour de l'Ain
 5th Overall Tour of Oman
1st  Young rider classification
 5th Mont Ventoux Dénivelé Challenge
 6th Tour du Doubs
 9th Overall Tour du Limousin
 9th Paris–Camembert
  Combativity award Stage 14 Tour de France
2021
 5th Overall Volta ao Algarve
1st Stage 5
 5th Overall Volta a la Comunitat Valenciana
 5th GP Miguel Induráin
 6th Overall Route d'Occitanie
2022
 4th Overall Tour of Oman
 5th Classic Grand Besançon Doubs
 6th Tour du Jura
 7th Trofeo Pollença - Port d'Andratx
 9th Prueba Villafranca de Ordizia

Grand Tour general classification results timeline

References

External links

1995 births
Living people
French male cyclists
Sportspeople from Saint-Brieuc
Cyclists from Brittany